is a Japanese manga series written and illustrated by Tomohito Oda. It has been serialized in Shogakukan's shōnen manga magazine Weekly Shōnen Sunday since May 2016, with its chapters collected in twenty-eight tankōbon volumes as of January 2023. The series is licensed in North America by Viz Media.

An eight-episode live-action television drama adaptation was broadcast from September to November 2021, and an anime television series adaptation produced by OLM aired from October to December of the same year. A second season aired from April to June 2022. The anime series is licensed by Netflix for worldwide streaming.

As of June 2022, the Komi Can't Communicate manga had over 7.4 million copies in circulation. In 2022, the manga won the 67th Shogakukan Manga Award for the shōnen category.

Premise

On her first day attending the elite Itan Private High School, Shoko Komi immediately receives an overwhelming surge in popularity due to the unprecedented stoic beauty and refined elegance her classmates perceive her to possess. However, only Hitohito Tadano, an exceedingly average schoolboy who sits next to her, discovers that behind her bishōjo appearance, Komi has a severe communication disorder. Tadano learns that Komi's goal is to make 100 friends, and resolves to help her reach her goal.

Publication

Prior to its serialization, a one-shot chapter was published in Shogakukan's Weekly Shōnen Sunday on September 16, 2015; the series then began serialization in the same magazine on May 18, 2016. Shogakukan has collected its chapters into individual tankōbon volumes. The first volume was published on September 16, 2016. As of January 18, 2023, twenty-eight volumes have been published.

In November 2018, during their panel at Anime NYC, Viz Media announced that they acquired the license for the manga. The first volume was released in North America on June 11, 2019. The manga is licensed in Southeast Asia by Shogakukan Asia, in Taiwan by Chingwin Publishing Group, in South Korea by SomyMedia, in Thailand by Luckpim, in Indonesia by Elex Media Komputindo, in Vietnam by Kim Đồng Publishing House, in France by Pika Édition, in Germany by Tokyopop, in Italy by J-Pop, in Argentina and Spain by Editorial Ivrea and in Brazil and Mexico by Panini Comics. In Turkey, in March 2022, Marmara Cizgi licensed the manga and released on 26 April 2022.

Related media

Anime
On May 11, 2021, an anime television series adaptation by OLM was announced. The series was directed by Kazuki Kawagoe, with Ayumu Watanabe serving as chief director, scripts by Deko Akao, character designs by Atsuko Nakajima and music by Yukari Hashimoto. The series aired on TV Tokyo from October 7 to December 23, 2021. Netflix streamed the series worldwide on a weekly basis from October 21, 2021, to January 6, 2022.  performed the series' opening theme "Cinderella", while  performed the series' ending theme "Hikare Inochi".

On December 23, 2021, Netflix announced that a second season was green-lit. It aired from April 7 to June 23, 2022, in Japan, while Netflix streamed it worldwide from April 27 to July 13, 2022. Miku Itō performed the opening theme "Ao 100 Shoku", while  performed the ending theme "Koshaberi Biyori".

On December 12, 2022, the official Komi Can't Communicate Twitter account announced that the anime production team did retakes of the animation for episodes in both seasons that had already been posted on Netflix.

Episode list

Season 1

Season 2

Drama
An eight-episode live-action television drama adaptation was broadcast on NHK General TV from September 6 to November 1, 2021. Aiko performed the series' theme song.

Reception
Komi Can't Communicate won the 67th Shogakukan Manga Award in the shōnen category in 2022. Polygon named the manga as one of the best comics of 2019.

As of September 2018, the first ten tankōbon volumes had over 2 million copies in circulation. As of February 2021, the first twenty tankōbon volumes had over 5.2 million copies in circulation. As of December 2021, the manga had over 6 million copies in circulation. As of June 2022, the manga had over 7.4 million copies in circulation.

The series ranked first in a 2020 poll conducted by AnimeJapan of "Most Wanted Anime Adaptation". The series won the Crunchyroll Anime Award for best comedy at the 6th Crunchyroll Anime Awards in 2022. Shoko Komi was also nominated for the "Best Girl" category while the series was nominated for the "Best Romance" award.

Critical response
In a review of the first volume from Anime News Network, Rebecca Silverman called the series "a nice little story with humor and a distinct lack of cruelty that doesn't break any new barriers but is definitely fun to read." Faye Hopper considered that it is hard to tell if the humor of the series lies in Komi's "seemingly outlandish, absurd behavior" or if it is a "legitimate depiction of anxiety that we laugh at because we relate." Hopper also called the character of Najimi a "transphobic punchline", criticizing the jokes about their gender fluidity, calling them "extremely tasteless", and that they "undermines the book's message by making light of an already marginalized community." Nevertheless, Hopper stated that the series "succeeds in spite of a potentially noxious premise," pointing out that the other characters are "just as dysfunctional as the eponymous Komi, creating a solid base of compassion and doing a good job [of] not casting her as a weird social outlier."

Notes

References

External links
  
  
  
 
 

 
2021 anime television series debuts
Anime series based on manga
Coming-of-age anime and manga
Crunchyroll Anime Awards winners
Netflix original anime
NHK television dramas
OLM, Inc.
Romantic comedy anime and manga
School life in anime and manga
Shogakukan manga
Shōnen manga
Slice of life anime and manga
TV Tokyo original programming
Viz Media manga
Winners of the Shogakukan Manga Award for shōnen manga